Larry Ekundayo (born Olanrewaju Ekundayo on 13 June 1982) is a Nigerian professional boxer. He held the African welterweight title from 2015 to 2016 and the IBF European welterweight title from 2018 to 2019.

Career  
Ekundayo was born in Lagos, Nigeria on 13 June 1982. He started boxing for self defense at the age of 12. In 1998, he won the Nigerian Amateur Bantamweight Championship and participated in the 1999 All-Africa Games in South Africa. He made a career switch from bantamweight to welterweight and won the Nigerian Amateur Welterweight Championship in year 2000. He participated in the 2002 Commonwealth Games in Manchester, UK and finished as a quarter-finalist.

In 2006 and 2007, he won the championship title of the London Regional Amateur Boxing Association (ABA) championship. As an amateur, he won 110 of 125 fights he was engaged in.

Larry’s career as a professional boxer started in November 2012 when he defeated three boxers in one night to become the Light Middleweight Prizefighter champion in London. He was the first boxer in the competition to be given a £2,000 knockout bonus.

On 30 October 2016, he defended his African Boxing Union’s Welterweight title by beating Ghanaian boxer, Joseph ‘The Double Horror’ Lamptey.

On 13 July 2018, he won the IBF European title by defeating John Thain in London in a fight that lasted 12 rounds.

Professional boxing record

References

External links 
 Larry Ekundayo on BoxRec.

Nigerian male boxers
1982 births
Living people
Sportspeople from Lagos
Yoruba sportspeople
Welterweight boxers
African Boxing Union champions
Competitors at the 1999 All-Africa Games
Boxers at the 2002 Commonwealth Games
Commonwealth Games competitors for Nigeria
African Games competitors for Nigeria
21st-century Nigerian people